The Remaining Days is a Canadian short comedy film, directed by Simon-Olivier Fecteau and released in 2004. The film stars Isidore Lapin as Gaston, an elderly man who discovers an old forgotten copy of his bucket list while cleaning out his closet, and decides to use his remaining days to carry out all the things he still hasn't done.

The film premiered at the Abitibi-Témiscamingue International Film Festival in 2004.

The film received a Genie Award nomination for Best Live Action Short Drama at the 26th Genie Awards in 2006.

References

External links
 

2004 films
2004 short films
2004 comedy films
French-language Canadian films
Canadian comedy short films
2000s Canadian films